Immanuel Higher Secondary School is a Christian educational institution located at Project Colony, Zünheboto. The school is registered with the Department of school Education, Nagaland.

References

Christian schools in Nagaland
Private schools in Nagaland
2010 establishments in Nagaland
Educational institutions established in 2010